A. Duane Litfin (born 1943) is an American academic administrator and evangelical minister. He was the seventh president of Wheaton College in Wheaton, Illinois.

Early life and education
Litfin was born on November 14, 1945. He holds an undergraduate degree in biblical studies from the Philadelphia College of Bible (now Cairn University) and a master's degree in theology from Dallas Theological Seminary. His two doctoral degrees are from Purdue University (communication) and Oxford (New Testament). He came to Wheaton in 1993 from Memphis, Tennessee, where he served the First Evangelical Church as senior pastor. Prior to that, he was an associate professor at Dallas Theological Seminary. He also taught at Purdue University and Indiana University. Litfin has authored several books and his writings have appeared in numerous journals and periodicals.

Career
His most recent book, Paul's Theology of Preaching, published in 2015, explores the Apostle Paul's vision of Christian ministry.   An article in the SoMA review discusses some of the more controversial aspects of his tenure at Wheaton.

Litfin was succeeded as president on July 1, 2010, by Philip Ryken, formerly senior pastor of the Tenth Presbyterian Church in Philadelphia and a 1988 graduate of Wheaton.

References

Living people
Dallas Theological Seminary alumni
Cairn University alumni
Purdue University alumni
Alumni of the University of Oxford
Wheaton College (Illinois)
People from Wheaton, Illinois
1943 births